Júnio Ricardo da Rocha (born 27 February 1997), commonly known as Júnio Rocha or simply Júnio, is a Brazilian footballer who plays as a right-back.

Club career
On 27 June 2018, Júnio joined Rio Ave on a season-long loan deal.

References

External links

1997 births
Sportspeople from Espírito Santo
Living people
Brazilian footballers
Association football defenders
Associação Atlética Ponte Preta players
Sport Club Internacional players
Sampaio Corrêa Futebol Clube players
Rio Ave F.C. players
Campeonato Brasileiro Série B players
Primeira Liga players
Brazilian expatriate footballers
Brazilian expatriate sportspeople in Portugal
Expatriate footballers in Portugal